Margaret Street is a major road in the central business district of Brisbane. The street is one of a number that were named after female members of the royal family shortly after the penal colony was settled.

Alice Street lies to the south, while Mary Street runs parallel to the north. Traffic flow along the street is restricted to one direction, towards the north east. From the south an exit ramp from the Riverside Expressway becomes Margaret Street at the William Street intersection.

Buildings
A second approach to the Vision Brisbane residential skyscraper, Brisbane Skytower was built on Margaret Street.
Part of the Queen's Wharf, Brisbane project is being built on Margaret Street. Another prominent building on the road is the skyscraper called Mineral House containing offices. Other tall buildings on the street are mostly apartment buildings including the Royal on Park and The Grosvenor.

History
In 1885 the Brisbane Hebrew Congregation built a synagogue on Margaret Street, which still stands today, largely unaltered.  In 1889, six attached houses, now known as The Mansions were built on the corner of George Street and Margaret Streets, an area that was once highly sought after because of its prestigious location.

Heritage listings 
Margaret Street has a number of heritage-listed sites, including:
 98 Margaret Street: Brisbane Synagogue
 125 Margaret Street: Acme Engineering Works (also known as HB Sales Building)
 129 Margaret Street: Watson Brothers Building
 Sections of Albert St, George St, William St, North Quay, Queen's Wharf Rd,: Early Streets of Brisbane

Major intersections

 Riverside Expressway
 William Street
 George Street
 Albert Street
 Edward Street
 Felix Street

See also

 Adelaide Street
 Ann Street
 Charlotte Street
 Elizabeth Street
 Queen Street

References

External links

 
Streets in Brisbane
Brisbane central business district